Dendrobium dearei (Deare's dendrobium) is a species of orchid of the genus Dendrobium. It is found in the Borneo and the Philippines. It grows to a maximum size of 7.5 cm.

References

dearei
Orchids of Borneo
Orchids of the Philippines
Plants described in 1882